John McGee (born January 27, 1973) is an American politician who served as a Republican member of the Idaho Senate, representing the 10th district from 2004 to 2012. He also served as the majority caucus chairman. He resigned in February 2012 following an accusation of sexual harassment.

Early life and education 
McGee was born in Nampa, Idaho and raised in Caldwell. He graduated from Vallivue High School in 1991 and received a Bachelor of Arts degree in history from the College of Idaho in 1995. He was elected student body president at both institutions.

Career 
McGee has been a marketing and public relations professional for over 20 years and currently serves as the marketing director at Caxton Printers in Caldwell.

He was named the 2006 "Idaho State Republican Legislator of the Year." John McGee resigned from the Idaho Senate on February 22, 2012.

McGee was elected as the chairman of the College of Idaho Board of Trustees in 2010. He decided to take a leave of absence in August 2011.

Elections

Caldwell

2021 
McGee was one of five candidates running for Caldwell, Idaho Mayor in the November 2021 election.

2019 
In 2019, McGee announced his candidacy for Caldwell City Council. In the three-way race, he defeated both the incumbent, Chuck Stadick and his Democratic opponent, Evangeline Beechler.

Because of the close results, Beechler successfully requested runoff election. Shortly after the runoff was announced, McGee was endorsed by outgoing Governor Butch Otter.

On December 3, 2019 McGee defeated Beechler in the run off with 2,072 votes, or 60.7% of the vote. It was noted by the media that the turn out in the run-off election was higher than that in the general election.

Idaho Senate District 10

2008 
McGee was unopposed in the Republican primary. McGee defeated Democratic nominee Harold L. Stiles with 72.9% of vote.

2006 
McGee was unopposed in the Republican primary and general election.

2004 
McGee defeated incumbent Ron McWilliams in the Republican primary with 59.01% of the vote. McGee was unopposed in the general election.

Legal issues

DUI
On June 19, 2011, McGee had been playing golf at the 2011 Hillcrest Invitational golf tournament and drank at the golf course that night. He later stole an SUV attached to a utility trailer, drove it through a residential neighborhood, and jack-knifed the truck and trailer in a resident's front yard. Ada County police officers arrested McGee for grand theft auto and driving under the influence. At the time of arrest, his blood alcohol content was reported at a .15, compared to the legal limit in the state of .08. On July 1, 2011, McGee pleaded guilty to misdemeanor DUI. The charges of felony theft and felony operation of a vehicle without consent were later dropped. The court sentenced McGee to 180 days in jail, with all but five days suspended, and three days of community service.

Sexual harassment
In 2012, McGee was accused by a 25-year-old staffer of locking her in his office and making graphic sexual overtures to her. On February 22, 2012, McGee submitted his letter of resignation to the Idaho Senate.

On August 21, 2012, McGee pleaded guilty to probation violation and a disturbing the peace charge related to sexual harassment that occurred at the Idaho State Capital Building. Fourth District Magistrate James Cawthon sentenced McGee to 44 days in jail for disturbing the peace and 44 days for violating terms of his probation stemming from the 2011 drunken driving conviction.

Personal life 
McGee and his wife, Hanna, have been married since 2005 and live in Caldwell with their daughter Madalyn and son, Maxwell.

Committees 
McGee served on the following committees:
 Local Government & Taxation Committee
 State Affairs Committee
Transportation Committee

Organizations 
 Past chairman of the Canyon County Republicans
 Member of the Caldwell Rotary Club
 Board of Directors of the 2009 International Special Olympics
 Regional Substance Abuse Authority Legislative Committee

Awards 
McGee has received:
 Distinguished Service Award from the National Association of Agriculture Educators
2004 Canyon Co. Republican of the Year
Distinguished Service Award from the National Association of State Foresters
 Idaho Agricultural All Star Award (2005–2009)
 COMPASS Leadership in Motion Award
 2009 Transportation Leader of the Year from Treasure Valley Women in Transportation
 Friend of Community Healthcare Centers by the Idaho Primary Care Association
 2006 Idaho State Republican Legislator of the Year
 2006 Idaho Young Republican of the Year
 Council of State Governments Toll Fellow in 2007

References

External links 
 Senator John McGee – Senator of District 10 Official Biography
 Idaho state Legislature - Senate Membership Official Government site
 Senator John McGee 

Republican Party Idaho state senators
Living people
College of Idaho alumni
1973 births
People from Caldwell, Idaho
People from Nampa, Idaho
Idaho politicians convicted of crimes